The Shocker Fest International Film Festival is a Californian film and video festival for horror films since 2002.

ShockerFest 2013 
ShockerFest International Film Festival 2013 was held on October 15–31, 2013. Unlike previous years, it was completely streamed online at Shocker Fest website.

2013 Official Selections 
 HORROR FEATURE
Amerikan Violence (dir. Michael Horgan)
Blood Redd (dir. Brad Palmer & producer Kyle Rea)
Sketch Collections of a Madman (dir. Emanuel Bermudez)
The Awakened (dir. Juan Gonzalez)
The Invoking (aka Sader Ridge) (dir. Jeremy Berg)
The Sunderland Experiment (dir. Adam Petke)
They Will Outlive Us All (dir. Patrick Shearer)

 HORROR SHORT
Battle Below (dir. Bruce Faulk)
Lonely Hearts (dir. Leon Chambers)
You Missed Sonja (dir. Felix Koch)

 HORROR MINI-SHORT
Apartment 15 (dir. Mattia Puleo)
Awakeing (dir. Elliot Sutherland)
Belly of the Wolf (dir. Mark Fisher)
Bloody Mary (dir. Collin Chan)
Cut Free (dir. Bernd Porr)
Dead Note (dir. Max Fisher)
Edward Lee's The Big Head (dir. Michael Ling)
Ghost Walk (dir. Lisa Rose Snow)
Last Night (dir. Chris Smellin)
Lollipop (dir. Blake Horobin)
Maid of Horror (dir. Caitlin Koller)
Mother (dir. Jorg Wohnsiedler)
OperHator (dir. Tara-Nicole Azarian)
Revelation (dir. Joseph Morgan)
Sky (dir. Ousa Khun)
Sulfuric (dir. Jeff Brown)
The Morning After (dir. Daryl Denner)
The Reaper's Image (dir. Dean Werner)
Witchfinder (dir. Colin Clarke)
Zombiewood (dir. Lauren Petke)

 SCIENCE FICTION FEATURE
Bad Ideas (dir. Ryan W. Martin)
No One Lives Forever (dir. Joseph Villapaz)
Frankenstein's Monster (dir. Syd Lance)
When Time Becomes a Woman (dir. Ahmad Alyaseer )

 SCIENCE FICTION MINI-SHORT
Aerodynamics (dir. Theodore Cormey)
Gaiaspora (dir. Matthew Mann)
Microgravity (dir. David Sanders)
Mine is Mine (dir. Kyle Bowe)
NOVR (dir. Geoff O'Rourke)
Passing (dir. Stephen Sherwood)
Supervised (dir. Rick Glenn)

 FANTASY MINI-SHORT
At All Times, Herald (dir. Dustin Neiderman)
Phoenix Song (dir. Kate Marzullo)
Rainbow's End (dir. Matthew Byrne)
Tokyo Halloween Night (dir. Mari Okada)

2013 Winners 
 Horror Feature - They Will Outlive Us All (dir. Patrick Shearer)
Audience Favorite - Blood Redd (dir. Brad Palmer)
 Horror Shorts - You Missed Sonja (dir. Felix Koch)
 Horror Mini-Shorts - Killer Kart (dir. James Feeney)
Audience Favorite - Edward Lee's The Big Head (dir. Michael Ling)
 Best Actor - Torey Widener (Blood Redd)
 Best Actress - Tarika Brandt (Microgravity)
 Best Actress - Stephanie Hullar (Blood Redd)
 Sci-Fi Feature - Found In Time (dir. Arthur Vincie)
Audience Favorite - Frankenstein's Monster (dir. Syd Lance)
 Sci-Fi Mini-Shorts - Passing (dir. Stephen Sherwood)
Audience Favorite - Passing (dir. Stephen Sherwood)
 Fantasy Feature - Nightmare Box (dir. Jon Keeyes)
 Fantasy Mini-Shorts - Rainbow's End (dir. Matthew Byrne)
Audience Favorite - Phoenix Song (dir. Kate Marzullo)
 Fantasy Short - Hawk (dir. MJ McMahon)

ShockerFest 2009 
ShockerFest 2009 was held on September 26–27, 2009, at the Galaxy 12 Theatre in Riverbank, California. The announced special guests were Eileen Dietz, Robert Axelrod and Brinke Stevens.

2009 Program 
Frank Sabella's Blood Night, Ursula Dabrowsky's Family Demons, Chris LaMartina's Grave Mistakes, Luke Ricci's How to Be a Serial Killer, Barbara Stepansky's Hurt, Michael Emanuel's Maneater, Jon Binkovski's Scare Zone, Dan Donley's Shellter, and Simeon Halligan's Splintered were announced as horror features, Aaron Yamasato's Blood of the Samurai II, Benjamin Pollack's Dark Room Theatre, Ken del Conte's Death Calls and Park Bench's The Death of Alice Blue as fantasy features and Christopher Mihm's Terror From Beneath the Earth was the only sci-fi feature. Additionally, as part of the short film program, 27 horror, 4 fantasy and 6 science-fiction short films were shown.

References

External links 
  (archive)
 MySpace
Fantasy and horror film festivals in the United States
Film festivals in California
Short film festivals in the United States
Internet film festivals
Science fiction film festivals